Wessel is a diminutive of the given name Werner of Frisian, German, and Dutch origin. People with this name include:

Given name
Wessel Freytag von Loringhoven (1899-1944), German military commander and member of the German Resistance
Wessel Gansfort (1419-1489), Dutch theologian and early humanist
Wessel Myburgh (born 1990), Namibian cricketer
Marthinus Wessel Pretorius (1819-1901), first president of the South African Republic
Wessel Roux (born 1975), South African rugby player
Wessel van Diepen (born 1966), Dutch radio host
Peter Wessel Zapffe (1899 – 1990), Norwegian metaphysician, author, lawyer and mountaineer

Surname
 Andreas Wessel (1858–1940), Norwegian physician and politician
 Bernhard Wessel (1936-2022), German football goalkeeper
 Beth Wessel-Kroeschell, American (Iowa) politician
 Birgit Wessel (1911–2000), Norwegian textile artist 
 Caspar Wessel (1745–1818), Dano-Norwegian mathematician who was the first person to describe the complex numbers
 Christer Wessel (born 1943), Swedish curler
 David Wessel (born 1954), American journalist
 Dick Wessel (1913–1965), American film actor
 Ellisif Wessel (1866–1949), Norwegian writer, trade unionist and politician
 Franz Wessel (1903–1958), German judge
 Friedrich Wessel (born 1945), German fencer
 Hedvig Wessel (born 1995), Norwegian freestyle skier
 Helene Wessel (1898-1969), German politician
 Hendricus Wessel (1887–1977), Dutch long-distance runner
 Henry Wessel, Jr. (1942–2018), American photographer 
 Horst Wessel (1907-1930), a Nazi brownshirt who was glorified as a martyr by the party in the Horst-Wessel-Lied
 Jessie Wessel (1894–1948), Swedish actress
 Johan Herman Wessel (1742–1785), Dano-Norwegian writer (brother of Caspar Wessel)
 Kai Wessel (countertenor) (born 1964), German countertenor
 Kathrin Weßel (born 1967), German long-distance runner
 Mark Wessel (1894–1973), American pianist and composer
 Mark Wessel, American educator
 Mike Wessel (born 1977), American mixed martial arts fighter
 Morris A. Wessel (1917–2016), American pediatrician
 Ole Christopher Wessel (1744–1794), Norwegian jurist and land surveyor 
 Pål Wessel, Norwegian geophysicist
 Paul Wessel (1904-1967), East German politician
 Peter Wessel (1690-1720), also known as Tordenskjold, a Dano-Norwegian naval war hero
 Ulrich Wessel (1946 –1975), German member of the Red Army Faction 
 Walter Wessel (1892 –1943), German Wehrmacht general
 Wilhelm Wessel, 17th-century German book publisher

See also
 Wessels, a (surname)

German-language surnames
Danish-language surnames
Norwegian-language surnames